The Village Blacksmith is a 1922 American silent melodrama film directed by John Ford and produced and distributed by Fox Film Corporation. One of the eight reels survives at the UCLA Film and Television Archive, and therefore the film is considered to be lost. It was loosely adapted from the poem of the same name by Henry Wadsworth Longfellow.

Plot 

As young men, the squire (Marshall) and the village blacksmith (Walling) are in love with the same woman (Boardman), whom the blacksmith marries. This angers the squire. Years later, the squire's son Anson (Yearsley) dares the blacksmith's son Johnnie (Hackathorne) to climb a tree, from which he falls and is crippled.

As adults, Anson and the blacksmith's daughter Alice (Valli) fall in love, which angers the blacksmith, who chastises his daughter. The blacksmith's other son Bill (Butler) returns from college and is injured in a train accident. Anson steals $840 from a church fund which is currently in Alice's possession. Alice is struck by lightning. The blacksmith take Anson and the squire to church where they both repent.

Cast

Reception 
The film was well received by audiences and by reviewers alike. The photography was highly praised.

References 
Citations

Works cited

External links 
 
 
 

1922 films
1922 drama films
1922 lost films
Silent American drama films
American silent feature films
American black-and-white films
Films based on works by Henry Wadsworth Longfellow
Films directed by John Ford
Fox Film films
Lost American films
Lost drama films
1920s American films